The University of the Philippines Los Baños (UPLB) is a state university located in the towns of Los Baños and Bay in the province of Laguna. It traces its roots to the UP College of Agriculture (UPCA), which was founded in 1909 by the American colonial government to promote agricultural education and research in the Philippines. UPLB was formally established in 1972 following the union of UPCA with four other Los Baños and Diliman-based UP units.

The university has played an influential role in Asian agriculture and biotechnology due to its pioneering efforts in plant breeding and bioengineering, particularly in the development of high-yielding and pest-resistant crops. In recognition for its work, it received the Ramon Magsaysay Award for International Understanding in 1977.

While people affiliated with University of the Philippines Los Baños practice in various disciplines, most of them specialize in agriculture and related fields. These include alumni, (among them 13 National Scientists) faculty and honorary degree recipients. As of 2014, there have been 33 who have graduated summa cum laude,  the highest distinction awarded by the university.

Alumni and faculty

Alumni

Faculty

Honorary degree recipients

LLD – Doctor of Laws

References

University of the Philippines Los Baños
Lists of people by university or college in the Philippines

Los_Banos
Lists of Filipino people by school affiliation